Eousdryosaurus ("eastern Dryosaurus") is a genus of basal iguanodontian dinosaur known from a partial skeleton discovered in Upper Jurassic rocks in western Portugal. The type, and only species, is Eousdryosaurus nanohallucis, named and described in 2014.

Discovery and naming
Eousdryosaurus is based on SHN(JJS)-170, kept in the Sociedade de História Natural in Torres Vedras, Portugal. The articulated and well-preserved specimen includes a hip vertebra and eight vertebrae from the proximal part of the tail, their chevrons, the left ilium, the entire left leg, and the right thigh bone (femur). These bones were discovered in sandstone of the late Kimmeridgian-age (late Jurassic, approximately 152 million years old) Praia da Amoreira-Porto Novo Member of the Lourinhã Formation in Porto das Barcas, Lourinhã, Portugal. The genus name is a reference to Eousdryosaurus being a relative of Dryosaurus on the east side of the Atlantic Ocean. The type and only species is E. nanohallucis, meaning "small hallux", in reference to the small size of that toe. Eousdryosaurus was named in 2014 by Fernando Escaso and colleagues, after having been described briefly in 2000.

Description

It is differentiated from other dryosaurids by various details of the vertebrae, hip, and hind limb. The foot is unique among ornithopods in that the first digit (the hallux or big toe) includes a single phalanx bone; most basal ornithopods had two phalanges, and most derived ornithopods, including hadrosaurs ("duckbills"), lost this digit.

Classification
Escaso et al. performed a phylogenetic analysis and found Eousdryosaurus to be a basal dryosaurid, a type of small bipedal herbivore near the base of Iguanodontia.

On the other hand, Dieudonné et al. (2020) found Eousdryosaurus to be a sister taxon to the Elasmaria.

References 

Iguanodonts
Kimmeridgian life
Late Jurassic dinosaurs of Europe
Jurassic Portugal
Fossils of Portugal
Lourinhã Formation
Fossil taxa described in 2014
Ornithischian genera